The riverweed darter (Etheostoma podostemone) is a species of freshwater ray-finned fish, a darter from the subfamily Etheostomatinae, part of the family Percidae, which also contains the perches, ruffes and pikeperches. It is endemic to the eastern United States, where it occurs in the upper Roanoke River drainage in Virginia and North Carolina. It inhabits rocky riffles of creeks and small rivers.

References

Etheostoma
Fish described in 1889
Taxa named by David Starr Jordan
Taxa named by Oliver Peebles Jenkins